Class rank is a measure of how a student's performance compares to other students in their class. It is commonly also expressed as a percentile. For instance, a student may have a GPA better than 750 of their classmates in a graduating class of 800.

Use in high schools 

The use of class rank is currently in practice at about less than half of American high schools. Large public schools are more likely to rank their students than small private schools. Because many admissions officers were frustrated that many applications did not contain a rank, some colleges are using other information provided by high schools, in combination with a student's GPA to estimate a student's class rank. Many colleges say that the absence of a class rank forces them to put more weight on standardized test scores.

Use in college admissions 
Colleges often use class rank as a factor in college admissions, although because of differences in grading standards between schools, admissions officers have begun to attach less weight to this factor, both for granting admission, and for awarding scholarships. Class rank is more likely to be used at large schools that are more formulaic in their admissions programs.

Percent plans 
Some U.S. states guarantee that students who achieve a high enough class rank at their high school will be admitted into a state university, in a practice known as percent plans. Students in California who are in the top nine percent of their graduating class, and students in Florida who are in the top twenty percent of their graduating class are guaranteed admission to some state school, but not necessarily any particular institution. The University of Alaska system awards an $11,000 scholarship for four years to students in the top 10% of their graduating class at Alaskan high schools. The top ten percent of students in Texas high schools are guaranteed admission to the state school of their choice, excluding the University of Texas, which only allocates 75% of its incoming freshman class seats to top 6% members.

See also 
 Rank-based grading in the United States
 Latin honors
 Salutatorian
 Valedictorian

References

External links 
 DESPERATELY SEEKING DIVERSITY; The 10 Percent Solution
 A global student and university ranking system (www.thestudentranking.com

Student assessment and evaluation
Educational evaluation methods